Leonov is a small lunar impact crater that lies to the south of Mare Moscoviense, one of the few maria on the far side of the Moon. This crater has a heart-shaped outline, due to an outward bulge along the northwest side. The rim of Leonov is worn, and several tiny craterlets lie along the edge. The inner walls and interior floor are relatively featureless.

In 1970, the crater was named after Russian cosmonaut Alexei Leonov, the first human to perform an extravehicular activity (EVA or "spacewalk") in Earth orbit in 1965.

References

 
 
 
 
 
 
 
 
 
 
 
 

Impact craters on the Moon
Alexei Leonov